Russia participated in the Eurovision Song Contest 2011 in Düsseldorf, Germany, selecting their entry internally. This was the country's fifteenth participation in the contest after debuting in 1994.

Before Eurovision

Internal selection 
On 5 March 2011, C1R announced that they had internally selected Alexey Vorobyov to represent Russia in Düsseldorf with the song "Get You" produced by RedOne. Vorobyov previously attempted to represent Russia at the Eurovision Song Contest twice, placing fifth in the 2008 national final with the song "New Russian Kalinka" and placing fourth in the 2009 national final with the song "Angelom byt". RedOne also composed the entry "Dance Alone" performed by Love Generation which failed to qualify from the Second Chance round of the 2011 Swedish Eurovision national final Melodifestivalen 2011. Alexey Vorobyov was selected as the Russian entrant by an expert committee from nine shortlisted candidates, among them which also included Alexey Vorobyov, Avraam Russo, Buranovskiye Babushki, Glukoza, Jamala, Mark Tishman, Philipp Kirkorov, Vera Brezhneva and Vlad Sokolovsky, as reported by Russian media.

"Get You" was set to be presented to the public on 12 March 2011 during the Russian version of Star Academy, broadcast on Channel One, however the song was leaked on YouTube prior to the presentation on 6 March 2011. "Get You" was written and composed by RedOne, AJ Junior, Bilal "The Chef", Eric Sanicola and Vorobyov himself.

At Eurovision

Russia began the Eurovision journey with Alex Sparrow (Alexey Vorobyov) as their representative in 2011. Russia competed in the first semi-final on 10 May 2011, with position 7. Russia had been tipped as an early favourite by the bookmakers to win the 2011 contest. After voting ended, Russia qualified for the grand final on Saturday 14 May, achieving 9th place and 64 points. The public awarded Russia 4th place with 93 points and the jury awarded 16th place with 31 points. After the first semi, Russia drew position 10 for the grand final. At the end of voting in the grand final, Russia ended 16th with 77 points, the worst placing for Russia since 1995, and only the second time they placed outside the top 15. The public awarded Russia 7th place with 138 points and the jury awarded 25th (last) place with 25 points.

Voting

Points awarded to Russia

Points awarded by Russia

References

2011
Countries in the Eurovision Song Contest 2011
Eurovision